Blues for Myself is an album by pianist Cedar Walton which was recorded in 1985 and released on the Italian Red label.

Reception 

Allmusic rated the album 4.5 stars. The Penguin Guide to Jazz wrote: "Despite Walton's extended bop lines and accompanist's sense of space and shading, it's a rather monochrome set and the piano sounds rather leaden."

Track listing 
All compositions by Cedar Walton except where noted.

 "Blues for Myself" – 3:54
 "Without a Song" (Edward Eliscu, Billy Rose, Vincent Youmans) – 4:00
 "Sixth Avenue" – 3:51
 "Sophisticated Lady" (Duke Ellington) – 3:30
 "Wonder Why (song)" (Nicholas Brodsky, Sammy Cahn) – 3:53
 "Little Darlin'" – 5:25
 "Let's Call This" (Thelonious Monk) – 3:10
 "Just In Time (song)" (Albert Ammons, Pete Johnson, Cedar Walton) – 5:11
 "Book's Bossa" (Walter Booker, Cedar Walton) – 5:21
 "Bridge Work" – 3:28

Personnel 
Cedar Walton – piano

References 

Cedar Walton albums
1986 albums
Red Records albums
Solo piano jazz albums